This article is about the gross regional product (GRP) of Swiss cantons in main fiscal years. All figures are from the Federal Statistical Office of Switzerland.

Cantons according to their gross regional product in 2020 in Swiss francs.

References 

Cantons by GDP
Cantons by GDP
Switzerland
Cantons of Switzerland